The West Wing is an American serial political drama television series created by Aaron Sorkin that aired on NBC from September 22, 1999 to May 14, 2006. The series is set primarily in the West Wing of the White House, where the Oval Office and offices of presidential senior staff are located, during the fictitious Democratic administration of Josiah Bartlet (played by Martin Sheen).

Series overview

Episodes

Season 1 (1999–2000)

Season 2 (2000–01)

Season 3 (2001–02)

Season 4 (2002–03)

Season 5 (2003–04)

Season 6 (2004–05)

Season 7 (2005–06)

Ratings

Specials 
Two special episodes were produced to complement the series and broadcast on NBC. The first was a terrorism-themed episode produced in the wake of the September 11 attacks. The episode pushed the scheduled season premiere back a week and encouraged viewers to donate to charity—profits from the episode and cast members' weekly pay were also donated. The episode "was written and produced in record time" – less than three weeks. Although timely and well-intentioned, the episode was criticized for being condescending and preachy. 

The second special interspersed the characters' fictional lives with interviews of real West Wing personnel, including Presidents Ford, Carter and Clinton; press secretaries Marlin Fitzwater and Dee Dee Myers; presidential advisors David Gergen, Paul Begala and incumbent Karl Rove; Secretary of State Henry Kissinger; Chief of Staff Leon Panetta; presidential personal secretary Betty Currie; and speechwriter Peggy Noonan. The documentary won a Primetime Emmy Award in 2002 for "Outstanding Special Class Program". Both episodes ran within the season 3 television season and were included on the season's DVD.

A third retrospective "clip-and-interview" special was slated to air in the hour before the series finale; however, it was axed and replaced with a re-run of the "Pilot" episode, as cast members were not contracted to do the special and there were disputes over pay.

"A West Wing Special to Benefit When We All Vote" (2020) 

"A West Wing Special to Benefit When We All Vote" is a reunion special that was released on HBO Max on October 15, 2020. The special serves as a stage version of the season 3 episode "Hartsfield's Landing". The special intended to raise awareness and support for When We All Vote, a non-profit organization that helps increase participation in United States elections.

See also
List of characters on The West Wing

Notes

References 

General references

External links
 

 
Lists of American drama television series episodes

he:הבית הלבן (סדרת טלוויזיה)#עלילה